The 12989 / 12990 Dadar–Ajmer Superfast Express is a Superfast Express train belonging to Indian Railways – North Western Railway zone that runs between  and  in India.

It operates as train number 12990 from Ajmer Junction to Dadar and as train number 12989 in the reverse direction, serving the state of Rajasthan, Gujarat & Maharashtra.

It is one of two trains that connect Ajmer to Mumbai, the other train being the Ajmer–Bandra Terminus Express.

Coaches

The 12990 / 89 Ajmer–Dadar Express presently has 2 AC 2 tier, 3 AC 3 tier, 13 Sleeper class, 4 General Unreserved & 2 SLR (Seating cum Luggage Rake) coaches. It does not have a pantry car.

As is customary with most train services in India, coach composition may be amended at the discretion of Indian Railways depending on demand.

Service

The 12990 Ajmer–Dadar Express covers the distance of 976 kilometres in 17 hours 20 mins (56.31 km/hr) & in 17 hours 30 mins as 12989 Dadar–Ajmer Express (55.77 km/hr).

As the average speed of the train is above 55 km/hr, as per Indian Railways rules, its fare includes a Superfast surcharge.

Routeing

Traction

As the route is fully electrified, a BRC based WAP-7 hauls the train on its entire end to end journey.

Gallery

Timings

12990 Ajmer–Dadar Express leaves Ajmer Junction every Wednesday, Friday & Sunday at 19:20 hrs IST and reaches Dadar at 12:40 hrs IST the next day.

12989 Dadar Ajmer Express leaves Dadar every Monday, Thursday & Saturday at 14:35 hrs IST and reaches Ajmer Junction at 08:05 hrs IST the next day.

References

External links

Transport in Ajmer
Transport in Mumbai
Rail transport in Maharashtra
Rail transport in Gujarat
Rail transport in Rajasthan
Express trains in India